Waldemar Andrzej Fydrych "Major" (born April 8, 1953) is a Polish activist and founding leader of the Orange Alternative movement in Poland.

Early career
Fydrych was born in Toruń, Poland on April 8, 1953. He is a graduate of the History and History of Art Faculty of the University of Wrocław. Fydrych began  his independent public activity in the 1970s. He created a branch of the Independent Students Union (NZS) in Wrocław and launched the Movement for New Culture in the city. He was also one of the co-organizers of a massive peace march that took place in April 1981.

During the Martial Law, many Poles first made acquaintance with Fydrych's work through his picturesque dwarf images painted on building walls, covering up the paint that was used to cover up anti-regime slogans.

The Orange Alternative
Starting in 1986, he began organizing a chain of happenings, which were eventually named the "Orange Alternative." These happenings involved hundreds up to thousands of participants at a given time. At its heyday in 1987, 1988 and 1989, Major Fydrych's "Orange Alternative" spread to other Polish cities, Warsaw, Łódź, Wrocław and Lublin being the most active. Altogether in the period of 1986 to 1990 the Orange Alternative organized over 60 street happenings.
In March 1988, after distributing women's sanitary pads on the street (an item that was in severe shortage in Communist Poland), Waldemar Fydrych was arrested and sentenced by the Court of Justice to three months of imprisonment. He was released following public uproar, including a letter to the military junta signed by the foremost Polish intellectuals and artists.

Nickname
During the communist regime, when Fydrych was called upon to fulfill his military service obligation, he appeared before the army commission dressed in a uniform of a major. Unwilling to enter the army, he pretended the opposite, simulating madness. Asked to use an appropriate tone in regard to his superiors, Fydrych began addressing his interlocutors per "colonel," at the same time describing himself as a "major," a nickname which remained with him ever since.

Recent activities
Fydrych, alongside a group of students, participated in the Orange Revolution in Ukraine organizing events in Poland and Ukraine. He and the students made in the streets an "Orange Scarf" of support for the revolution. 
This scarf was started in Warsaw by one of the icons of the Orange Revolution - famous Ukrainian singer Ruslana Lyzhichko. On the night of the "Orange Victory," the 15-meter long scarf was handed by Lyzhichko to President Yushchenko as one of the main symbols of the brotherhood between Ukraine and Poland.

In 2002, Fydrych presented himself in elections to the post of the Mayor of the City of Warsaw. He also ran for mayor of Warsaw in 2006 elections, gaining 2914 votes (0,41%). His organization was Dolts and Dwarves (Gamonie i Krasnoludki).

In 2012, Fydrych received Ph.D. in Fine Arts from the Academy of Fine Arts in Warsaw, Poland after defending his thesis "Happening as the integrating and healing operation transforming art and reality" written under supervision of Professor Stanisław Wieczorek.

In 2014, the English translation of his book on Orange Alternative was published as "Lives of the Orange Men" by a London publishing house, Minor Compositions. with a foreword by the Yes-Men and the forward to the Polish edition by Anne Applebaum.

In 2013, Major Fydrych and his dwarf graffiti were featured in Brad Finger's book „Surrealism - 50 Works of Art You Should Know” published  by PRESTEL Publishing along with works of such great artists as Artaud, Duchamp, Buñuel, Dali and Picasso.

Honors and awards
 1988 Solidarity Award of Puls in London.
 1988 Award of Polkul in Australia.
 In June 2005, Fydrych and the Orange Alternative movement were honored by an exposition held at the European Parliament in Brussels.
 Four films have been produced and aired on the public Polish Television (TVP), including a documentary on the Orange Alternative and the Orange Revolution.

Publications
 Fydrych, W. Hokus Pokus
 Fydrych, W. The Lives of the Orange Men Publisher: Minor Compositions. July 2014. 
 Fydrych, W. Dwarves & Dolts
 Fydrych, W. The Orange Alternative - Revolution of Dwarves

Quotes

 "In Poland there are only three places when you can feel free: in churches, but only for the meditations, in prisons, but not everyone can go to prison, and on the streets - they are the freest places."
 "The Western World will find out much more about the situation in Poland from hearing that I was put to jail for giving tampons to a woman, than from reading the books and articles written by other people from the opposition."
 "Can you treat a police officer seriously, when he is asking you the question: 'Why did you participate in an illegal meeting of dwarfs?"

See also
 Poland
 Orange Alternative
 Martial law in Poland

References

External links
 Major Fydrych's personal website
 Brief biography on the Orange Alternative website (based on the doctoral thesis Nicole Gourgaud, Université de Lyon – November 1993)
 Brief biography on the Orange Alternative Museum website

1953 births
Living people
People from Toruń
Polish artists
Polish dissidents
University of Wrocław alumni